Martha Boto (27 December 1925 – 13 October 2004) was an Argentinian artist. Boto was born in Buenos Aires, Argentina, and was co-founder of the Group of Non-Figurative Artists of Argentina. She is considered to be a pioneer of kinetic and programmed art.

Life 
Coming from a family of artists, where they always supported her in her vocation. She studied drawing and painting at Escuela Superior de Bellas Artes in 1944, and graduated in 1950.

She moved to Paris in 1959 with her husband and collaborator Gregorio Vardanega, where she lived until her death in 2004.

Work 

Boto's earliest work was primarily geometric abstractions. During the 50s she had her first concerns regarding space, which ended in creations of structures where she made use of plexiglass with colored water. By 1956, she joined the Concrete art group "Arte Nuevo".

She was among the first artists in Buenos Aires to use movement as a component in her sculptures. In 1957, she started the group Artistas No Figurativos de la Argentina alongside Gregorio Vardanega.

In 1959 she moved to Paris and a year later she took part in the I Biennale de Paris where her career as a kinetic artist took off, her work was centered on the concepts of movement, light and color.

After Boto moved to Paris, Denise René promoted her work. Boto began to incorporate more industrial materials, such as electric motors,  into her sculptures at this time.

She was known for her "investigations led on the principle of repetition in the world of reflection". Boto looked for an art capable of awakening different emotions, psychological reactions of joy and tension, an art that could become a medicine for the spirit.

Representative Artworks 

 Optical Structure, 1962, plexiglass, 90 x 45 x 45 cm.
 Contraction and expansion of lines. 1964, moving-light machine.
 Permanent vibrations, 1965, moving-light electric machine, 90 x 90 x 60 cm.
 Luminous intersections, 1965, moving-light electric machine, 60x 60 x 45 cm.
 Microlux (box). 1965, moving-light machine, 65 x 65 x 30 cm, MNBA collection, Buenos Aires.
 Plus Helicoidal (box), 1967. MNBA collection, Buenos Aires.
 Chromo- optique (multiple box), 1968. Jozami collection.
 Déplacement optique C (multiple box, 19, 200), 1969. Jozami collection.
 Mouvements chromocinétiques, 1971. MNBA collection, Buenos Aires.

Personal Exhibitions 

 1952 - Van Riel Gallery, Buenos Aires, Argentina.
 1953 - Van Riel Gallery, Buenos Aires, Argentina.
 1954 - Krayd Gallery, Buenos Aires, Argentina.
 1955 - Krayd Gallery, Buenos Aires, Argentina.
 1956 - Galatea Gallery, Buenos Aires, Argentina.
 1957 - Estímulo de Bellas Artes, Buenos Aires, Argentina.
 1958 - H. Gallery, Buenos Aires, Argentina.
 1961 - Denise René Gallery. Art abstrait constructif international, Paris, France.
 1964 - Maison des Beaux-Arts, C.R.O.U.S., Paris, France.
 1969 - Denise René Gallery, Paris, France.
 1976 - Centre d’Action Culturelle Les Gémeaux, Paris, France.
 1993 - Espace Bateau Lavoir, Paris, France.
 1996 - Galerie Argentine, Paris, France.
 1997 - Saint-Lambert Post Office, Paris, France.
 1998 - The Eye's Pop: Op Art, Albright-Knox Art Gallery, Buffalo, United States.
 2003 - Geometrías Heterodoxas, Museum of Modern Art of the City of Buenos Aires, Buenos Aires, Argentina.
 2004 - Moving Parts: Forms of the Kinetic, Museum Tinguely, Basel, Switzerland; Kunsthaus, Gras, Austria.
 2006 - Contact Le cyber Cosmos de Boto et Vardanega, Sicardi Gallery.

Collective exhibitions 

 1962 - 30 Argentines of the New Generation, Creuze Gallery, París.
 1962 - Art latino américain à Paris: Martha Boto, Jorge Camacho, Simona Ertan, Joaquin Ferrer, Eduardo Jonquieres, Wifredo Lam, Roberto Matta, Jesus Rafael Soto, Hervé Télémaque..., Musée d'art moderne de la ville de Paris.
 1963 - Denise René Gallery, Düsserdorf.
 1964 - New tendencies, Museo de Artes Decorativas, Paris.
 1964/65 - Movement II, Denise René Gallery, Paris.
 1964/65 - Albright-Knox Museum, Buffalo, United States.
 1964/65 - Light-Movement and Optics, Palace of Fine Arts, Brussels.
 1964/65 - New tendencies III, Zagreb Museum.
 1964/65 - Movement, Stockholm Museum, Sweden.
 1964/65 - Kunsthalle, Museum of Bern, Switzerland.
 2003 - Geometrias heterodoxas: Martha Boto, Eugenia Crenovich, Simona Ertan, Auguste Herbin, Virgilio Villalba..., Musée d'art moderne de Bucarest.
 2004 - Movable Parts: Forms of the Kinetic, Kunsthaus, Graz, Austria.
 2005 - Extreme Abstraction, Albright-Knox Art Gallery, Buffalo, United States.
 2006 - Contact le Cyber Cosmos de Boto y Verdanega, Sicardi Gallery, Houston Texas, United States.
 2007 - Lo[s] Cinético[s], Reina Sofía National Art Center Museum. Madrid Spain.
 2007 - Op Art, Schirn Kunsthalle Frankfurt, Frankfurt, Germany.
 2012 - Constructed Dialogues: Concrete, Geometric and Kinetic Art from the Latin American Art Collection, Museum of Fine Arts. Houston, Texas, United States.
 2015 - Un Tournant - A turning point: Antonio Asis, Martha Boto, Horacio García Rossi, Hugo De Marziani, Georgio Vardanega, Sicardi Gallery. Houston, Texas, United States.

Bibliography 

 Herrera, M.J. Real Virtual, arte cinético argentino en los años sesenta. (pág. 211). 1era edición. Buenos Aires. Amigos del Museo Nacional de Bellas Artes (2012).
 Rivenc, R. and Reinhard, B. (2016). Keep it Moving? Conserving Kinetic Art. Los Angeles. Getty Publications.

References

2004 deaths
1925 births
Argentine artists
20th-century Argentine women artists
21st-century Argentine women artists